The 2001 NCAA Division II men's basketball tournament was the 45th annual single-elimination tournament to determine the national champion of men's NCAA Division II college basketball in the United States.

Officially culminating the 2000–01 NCAA Division II men's basketball season, the tournament featured forty-eight teams from around the country.

The Elite Eight, national semifinals, and championship were played, for the first time, at the Centennial Garden in Bakersfield, California.

After losing in the previous year's final, Kentucky Wesleyan (31–3) defeated Washburn in the final, 72–63, to win their record eighth Division II national championship. It was additionally their second title in three years and fourth consecutive appearance in the title game.

The Panthers were coached by Ray Harper. Kentucky Wesleyan's Lorico Duncan was the Most Outstanding Player.

Regionals

Northeast - Garden City, New York 
Location: Woodruff Hall Host: Adelphi University

South - St. Petersburg, Florida 
Location: MacArthur Physical Education Center Host: Eckerd College

Great Lakes - Owensboro, Kentucky 
Location: Sportscenter Host: Kentucky Wesleyan College

North Central - St. Cloud, Minnesota 
Location: Halenbeck Hall Host: St. Cloud State University

South Atlantic - Charlotte, North Carolina 
Location: Brayboy Gymnasium Host: Johnson C. Smith University

South Central - Topeka, Kansas 
Location: Lee Arena Host: Washburn University

East - Fort Mill, South Carolina 
Location: Hornets Training Facility Host: Queens College, with support from the NBA Charlotte Hornets

West - Bellingham, Washington 
Location: Haggen Court at Sam Carver Gymnasium Host: Western Washington University

Elite Eight - Bakersfield, California
Location: Bakersfield Centennial Garden Host: California State University, Bakersfield

All-tournament team
 Lorico Duncan, Kentucky Wesleyan (MOP)
 Marshall Sanders, Kentucky Wesleyan
 Ewan Auguste, Washburn
 Ryan Murphy, Washburn
 Sylvere Bryan, Washburn

See also
 2001 NCAA Division II women's basketball tournament
 2001 NCAA Division I men's basketball tournament
 2001 NCAA Division III men's basketball tournament
 2001 NAIA Division I men's basketball tournament
 2001 NAIA Division II men's basketball tournament

References
 NCAA Division II men's basketball tournament Results
 2001 NCAA Division II men's basketball tournament jonfmorse.com

NCAA Division II men's basketball tournament
NCAA Division II basketball tournament
NCAA Division II basketball tournament